Tessmann is a surname. Notable people with the surname include:

Bernhard Tessmann (1912–1998), German scientist
Brad Tessmann (born 1960), Australian rugby league player
Heath Tessmann (born 1984), Australian rugby union player
Tanner Tessmann (born 2001), American soccer player